Hans F. Dersch (born December 25, 1967) is an American former competition swimmer and breaststroke specialist who represented the United States at the 1992 Summer Olympics in Barcelona, Spain.  There he won the gold medal in the men's 4×100-meter medley relay, after having swum in the preliminary heats for the winning U.S. team.  Dersch was a two-time gold medalist at the 1991 Pan American Games.

See also
 List of Olympic medalists in swimming (men)
 List of University of Texas at Austin alumni

References
 
 Profile

1967 births
Living people
American male breaststroke swimmers
Olympic gold medalists for the United States in swimming
Pan American Games gold medalists for the United States
Sportspeople from Alexandria, Virginia
Swimmers at the 1991 Pan American Games
Swimmers at the 1992 Summer Olympics
Texas Longhorns men's swimmers
Medalists at the 1992 Summer Olympics
Pan American Games medalists in swimming
Medalists at the 1991 Pan American Games
Swimmers from Virginia